Reload Bulgaria (formerly Bulgaria Uncensored) is a populist political party in Bulgaria.

History

The party was created by former TV host Nikolay Barekov in January 2014. It ran for the first time in the May 2014 European Parliament election, taking one seat in the European Parliament as part of a coalition with IMRO and joined the soft eurosceptic group of European Conservatives and Reformists.

This BBT-IMRO coalition did not last, however, and IMRO left to team up with other nationalist parties for the parliamentary elections of October 2014. On 18 August 2014 BBT sealed a coalition agreement with LIDER to run in the upcoming elections.

In June 2014, Barekov declared his support for the restoration of the Bulgarian Monarchy and Simeon II as Tsar of Bulgaria. He vowed that should his party win a general election, he would introduce referendums on a number of issues, including the restoration of the monarchy.

Despite holding 15 seats in the Assembly, Reload Bulgaria chose not to compete in the 2017 parliamentary elections after being initially refused a name change, among other reasons.

Election results

National Assembly

European Parliament

References

Conservative parties in Bulgaria
Monarchist parties
Monarchism in Bulgaria
Nationalist parties in Bulgaria
Political parties established in 2014
2014 establishments in Bulgaria
Eastern Orthodox political parties
Right-wing populist parties